ASCP may refer to:

American Society for Clinical Pathology
American Society of Consultant Pharmacists 
Australasian Society for Continental Philosophy